This is a list of bus routes that are part of the bus network, in Melbourne, Australia.

Kinetic Melbourne operate approximately 30% of the bus network, signing contracts in 2021 as part of the Melbourne Metropolitan Bus Franchise. The remaining 70% of the network is operated under 23 contracts with other bus operators, all of these contracts were entered into in mid-2018 and will expire in 2025 or 2028.

Route numbering scheme
The route number of buses in Melbourne can tell a little about the route's operator, area served and even its history.

Route numbering was a reflection of the designated zonal area used during the 1980s. Areas were referred to as "Neighbourhood Zones". However, as part of the "Grow or Go" policies, route numbers across the bus network were affected. There are no two-digit route numbers – these are used exclusively by trams.

150–199, 400–899: These routes are run by private companies. Most are found in the middle and outer suburbs, where they provide feeders to railway Stations and provide local travel.
200–399: These routes were former government-run routes (Melbourne & Metropolitan Tramways Board and then MetBus). They are found mostly in inner suburbs such as Footscray/Sunshine, Elsternwick-Brighton, Clifton Hill and Port Melbourne. Routes in the Doncaster/Templestowe area also have these numbers due to a Tramways board takeover after the area's private operator collapsed. In the 1990s all MetBus routes were put out to private franchise. Until August 2013, these services were operated by Melbourne Bus Link and National Bus Company. All of these services were taken over by Transdev Melbourne, which were since taken over by Kinetic Melbourne
900 series: Historically these route numbers were used by Victorian Railways, who ran buses co-ordinated with trains on some routes. Routes with these numbers have either been abolished or incorporated into other routes. The 900 series is now used for the high frequency SmartBus services, which are mostly cross-town and orbital routes.

By route number

100-199

200–299

300–399

400–499

500–599

600–699

700–799

800–899

900–999

Airports

Former Routes

By bus company

See also
 Buses in Melbourne
 Transport in Melbourne
 List of Victorian Bus Companies
 Transportation in Australia

References

External links

 Public Transport Victoria (PTV) (official public transport website)

 
Bus routes, Melbourne
Melbourne